Brodie McIntosh (born 16 July 1974) is an IPSC competitor from Australia who took bronze in the 2002 and 2014 World Shoot. He has also won the Australian Handgun Championship 15 times.

References

External links 
 The Official Webpage of Brodie McIntosh

1974 births
Living people
Australian male sport shooters
IPSC shooters
21st-century Australian people